is a Japanese voice actress from Kagoshima Prefecture affiliated with the agency Across Entertainment. After aspiring to become a voice actress early in life, she made her acting debut in 2012 as the character Rin Shibuya in The Idolmaster Cinderella Girls franchise. She is also known for her roles as Myoko in Arpeggio of Blue Steel and Hotaru Rindō in Qualidea Code.

Biography 
Fukuhara was born in Kagoshima Prefecture on December 31, 1989. Early in life, she dreamed of becoming a veterinarian, but after listening to a radio drama adaptation of the manga series Hunter × Hunter, she became aware of the occupation of voice acting, and decided to pursue that career track instead. She then took correspondence training lessons to improve her voice skills, while also reading manga aloud in order to practice her acting skills. In high school, she was a member of her school's broadcasting club; she later participated in the national radio contest sponsored by NHK, becoming the first student of her school to make it to the contest, although she was unable to win any award. During her time at the training school, she became part of the voice acting agency VIMS.

In 2012, she made her voice acting debut as the character Rin Shibuya in the video game The Idolmaster Cinderella Girls. She graduated from university the following year. She would then play mainly supporting or background roles in anime until 2015 when she was cast as the character Myōkō in the anime film Arpeggio of Blue Steel: Ars Nova DC. She also reprised the role of Rin for the anime adaptation of The Idolmaster Cinderella Girls. In 2016, she was cast as the character Grea in the anime series Rage of Bahamut: Manaria Friends, and Hotaru Rindō in the anime series Qualidea Code. In 2017, she played the roles of Sayaka Igarashi in Kakegurui – Compulsive Gambler, and Kasumi Ayase in the anime series Dies Irae. She played the role of Tarō Misaki in a new television series adaptation of the manga series Captain Tsubasa in 2018. That same year, she was cast as Mega Man in the video game Mega Man 11.

On October 25, 2020, Fukuhara announced she has married fellow voice actor Reo Nakanishi.

On January 6, 2022, Fukuhara announced that she has transferred to Across Entertainment, after leaving VIMS on November 30, 2021.

Filmography

Anime

Films

Video games

Dubbing

References

External links
 Across Entertainment profile 
  
 
 Ayaka Fukuhara at Oricon 

1989 births
Living people
Across Entertainment voice actors
Japanese video game actresses
Japanese voice actresses
Voice actresses from Kagoshima Prefecture
21st-century Japanese actresses